Sir Paul Alfred Reeves,  (6 December 1932 – 14 August 2011) was a New Zealand clergyman and civil servant, serving as Archbishop and Primate of New Zealand from 1980 to 1985 and 15th Governor-General of New Zealand from 20 November 1985 to 20 November 1990. He was the first governor-general of Māori descent. He also served as the third Chancellor of Auckland University of Technology, from 2005 until his death.

Early life and education
Reeves was born in Wellington, New Zealand, on 6 December 1932, the son of D'arcy Reeves by his marriage to Hilda Pirihira, who had moved from Waikawa to Newtown, a working-class suburb of Wellington. Hilda was of Māori descent, of the Te Āti Awa iwi; D'arcy was Pākehā and worked for the tramways.
Reeves was educated at Wellington College and at Victoria College, University of New Zealand (now the Victoria University of Wellington), where he graduated with a Bachelor of Arts in 1955 and a Master of Arts in 1956. He went on to study for ordination as an Anglican priest at St John's College, Auckland, receiving his Licentiate in Theology in 1958.

Ministry as deacon and priest
Reeves was ordained deacon in 1958. After serving a brief curacy at Tokoroa, he spent the period 1959–64 in England. From 1959 until 1961 he was an Advanced Student at St Peter's College, Oxford (Bachelor of Arts 1961, Master of Arts 1965) as well as Assistant Curate at the University Church of St Mary the Virgin. He was ordained priest in 1960. He served two further curacies in England, first at Kirkley St Peter (1961–63), then at Lewisham St Mary (1963–64).

Returning to New Zealand, Reeves was Vicar of Okato St Paul (1964–66), Lecturer in Church History at St John's College, Auckland (1966–69), and Director of Christian Education for the Anglican Diocese of Auckland (1969–71).

Ministry as bishop, archbishop, and primate
In 1971 Reeves was appointed Bishop of Waiapu and consecrated to the episcopate on 25 March. He was Bishop of Auckland from 1979 to 1985, and additionally as Archbishop and Primate of New Zealand, the leader of New Zealand's Anglicans, from 1980 to 1985.

During this time Reeves also served as chairman of the Environmental Council (1974–76), and he served as president of the National Council of Churches in New Zealand (1984–85).

Reeves was a supporter of Citizens for Rowling (the campaign for the re-election of Labour Prime Minister Bill Rowling).

Governor-general

Appointment
On the advice of Prime Minister David Lange, Queen Elizabeth II appointed Reeves the 15th Governor-General of New Zealand effective from 20 November 1985. His appointment was met with some scepticism due to his previous political involvement in Citizens for Rowling, opposing the 1981 Springbok Tour, and the fact that he was an Anglican bishop. Leader of the Opposition Jim McLay opposed the appointment on these grounds, asking "How can an ordained priest fulfil that [constitutional] role?" Many Māori groups welcomed the appointment, with Sir James Henare arguing that "It must be a fruit of the Treaty of Waitangi to see a person from our people." He was the first (and up to the present the only) cleric to hold the post. Moreover, as a member of the Puketapu hapū of the Te Āti Awa of Taranaki, he was the first governor-general of Māori descent.

Tenure
As a clergyman, Reeves opted not to wear the military uniform of the governor-general. During his term, Reeves joined the Newtown Residents' Association, and invited members of that association to visit Government House, Wellington. He hosted the first open day at Government House on 7 October 1990, and employed the first public affairs officer, Cindy Beavis, to promote the governor-general's role.

Reeves remained in office until 20 November 1990. He was succeeded by Dame Catherine Tizard.

Controversies
During Reeves' tenure, the Fourth Labour Government made radical changes to the New Zealand economy, later known as Rogernomics. In November 1987 Reeves made comments critical of Rogernomics, stating that the reforms were creating "an increasingly stratified society". He was rebuked for these comments by Lange, but later stated in May 1988 "...the spirit of the market steals life from the vulnerable but the spirit of God gives life to all". Reeves later recalled that this marked a "parting of ways" with the government.

Reeves also recalled "I had a little sense of being left alone and felt that I needed to be taken into the loop more, or be taken seriously." Reeves wrote to the Queen, but did not receive replies directly from the Queen. He said, "I used to write to the Queen and express my opinion about this and that going on it  the country and I wouldn't get a direct reply from her but I would always get a lengthy reply from her private secretary, which I took was expressing her viewpoint."

On a state visit to Vanuatu in 1988, Reeves was invited to kill a pig at a ceremony, creating controversy as he was patron of the Royal New Zealand Society for the Prevention of Cruelty to Animals. He later resigned as patron. This was followed by a similar incident when Reeves was a member of a party that shot an endangered bird during a trip to New Zealand's sub-Antarctic islands in December 1989. The bird was a light-mantled albatross and protected under the Wildlife Act 1953, however the Department of Conservation Southland operations manager Lou Sanson accepted that the shooting was accidental.

Retirement
After his retirement from the viceregal office, Reeves became the Anglican Consultative Council Observer at the United Nations in New York (1991–93) and Assistant Bishop of New York (1991–94). From 1994 until 1995 he served briefly as Dean of Te Whare Wānanga o Te Rau Kahikatea (the theological college of Te Pihopatanga o Aotearoa, and a constituent member of St John's College, Auckland). He was also Deputy Leader of the Commonwealth Observer group to South Africa, Chair of the Nelson Mandela Foundation, and Visiting Montague Burton Professor of International Relations at the University of Edinburgh.

Reeves went on to chair the Fiji Constitution Review Commission from 1995 until 1997, culminating in Fiji's readmission to the Commonwealth, until its suspension in 2000. On 12 December 2007 it was reported that Reeves was involved with "secret talks" to resolve Fiji's year-long political crisis, following the 2006 Fijian coup d'état.

In 2004, Reeves made a statement in support of New Zealand republic, stating in an interview, "...if renouncing knighthoods was a prerequisite to being a citizen of a republic, I think it would be worth it."

Reeves served as the Chancellor of the Auckland University of Technology, from February 2005 until August 2011.

In July 2011, Reeves announced that he had been diagnosed with cancer, and therefore was retiring from all public responsibilities. He died from cancer on 14 August 2011, aged 78.

Honours and other awards
Reeves was awarded the Queen Elizabeth II Silver Jubilee Medal (1977), he was appointed a Chaplain of the Most Venerable Order of the Hospital of Saint John of Jerusalem in April 1982, Knight Bachelor in the 1985 Queen's Birthday Honours, a Knight Grand Cross of the Order of St Michael and St George on 6 November 1985, a Knight of Justice of the Most Venerable Order of the Hospital of Saint John of Jerusalem in 1986, and a Knight Grand Cross of the Royal Victorian Order on 2 March 1986. In 1990 he became a Companion of the Queen's Service Order. Reeves was also made a Companion of the Order of Fiji.

There was some concern regarding Reeves' using the title Sir, as members of the clergy in the Church of England do not usually receive this title when knighted, and the same rule presumably applied to the Anglican Church in New Zealand. Moreover, clergy are traditionally not dubbed. To avoid placing the Queen in an awkward situation (governors-general would by tradition be knighted by her in person at Buckingham Palace), the prime minister of the time, David Lange, made Reeves a Knight Bachelor before meeting her. Consequently, when Reeves went to receive the Knight Grand Cross of the Order of St Michael and St George from the Queen, he was already Sir Paul.

On Waitangi Day 2007 Reeves was awarded New Zealand's highest honour, being admitted to the Order of New Zealand.

The University of Oxford conferred on him the degree of Doctor of Civil Law in 1985 and his college, St Peter's, appointed him an Honorary Fellow in 1981 and a Trustee in 1994. A Fellowship of St John's College, Auckland followed in 1989. He has received other honorary degrees, including an LLD of Victoria University of Wellington (1989), a DD of the General Theological Seminary, New York (1992), and the degree of Doctor Honoris Causa of the University of Edinburgh (1994).

Changes to the rules in 2006 allowed him to use the style The Honourable for life.

Arms

References

External links

Biography at Holy Trinity Cathedral website
Official biographies of former Governors–General of New Zealand
Radio NZ interview, 8 May 2011 Sir Paul talks extensively about his life and work with interviewer Chris Laidlaw. (Listen directly or download options)

1932 births
2011 deaths
Alumni of St Peter's College, Oxford
Primates of New Zealand
Anglican bishops of Auckland
Anglican bishops of Waiapu
Honorary Fellows of St Peter's College, Oxford
People educated at Wellington College (New Zealand)
Governors-General of New Zealand
Knights of Justice of the Order of St John
New Zealand republicans
20th-century Anglican archbishops in New Zealand
Victoria University of Wellington alumni
New Zealand Māori religious leaders
Te Āti Awa people
Members of the Order of New Zealand
New Zealand Knights Grand Cross of the Order of St Michael and St George
New Zealand Knights Grand Cross of the Royal Victorian Order
Companions of the Queen's Service Order
Companions of the Order of Fiji
New Zealand Knights Bachelor
Academics of the University of Edinburgh